Venus in Copper is a 1991 historical mystery crime novel by Lindsey Davis and the third book of the Marcus Didius Falco Mysteries series. Set in Rome during AD 71, just after the year of the four emperors, the novel stars Marcus Didius Falco, informer and imperial agent. The copper of the title refers to a simple copper signet ring featuring a portrait of Venus, worn by the suspect Severina Zotica. That Venus was the goddess of love hints at the motives for some of the murders perpetrated by the suspect: revenge out of unrequited love.

Plot summary
The story begins in Rome during late spring, AD 71. Falco is in the Latumiae Prison, accused by the spy Anacrites of having stolen lead ingots which were property of the State (Shadows in Bronze). Bailed out by his mother, Falco is heading across the city to visit Helena Justina when he is beaten up by his landlord's bullyboys for defaulting on his rent—despite having been bailed out by none other than Helena Justina. Marcus decides to resume working as an independent, despite the fact that this means he is unlikely to be able to earn enough money to buy himself into a higher rank so that he can marry Helena.

Luck seems to smile down on Falco. A slave, Hyacinthus arrives at Falco's apartment in Fountain Court to ask him to assist the Hortensii, a trio of nouveau riche freedmen. Hyacinthus also recommends a real estate agent to Falco named Cossus, who eventually gets Falco a new home. Falco agrees to visit the Hortensii, who live on the Pincian Hill. There, Sabina Pollia informs him that all of the Hortensii (Crepito, Felix, Novus and their wives) live together in the one house. Novus is the only one currently unwed and he is due to marry Severina Zotica, but Sabina Pollia informs Falco that she believes Severina plans to murder Novus. Falco chooses to investigate Sabina's claims. At the same time he also begins to hunt for a new apartment in which to live.

During the course of the investigation, Falco is once more arrested and imprisoned in the Latumiae by Anacrites, who then brings forth his charges regarding the lead ingots (from the two novels preceding Venus in Copper) to Titus but Falco persuades Titus to free him, provided he repays whatever is owed for the lead to Emperor Vespasian, and is asked to undertake more work for the Palace. Falco agrees to be available provided he is paid for previous missions that have already been completed. This is agreed to by Titus, who then presents Falco with a huge turbot, which vexes Falco as he not only has to investigate Severina—but to find a suitable way of cooking the turbot as well! The arrival of the turbot becomes the cause of an impromptu party amongst friends and family of the Didii. Helena arrives, complete with baggage with which to move in with Falco, only to discover that she had not been invited to the party. Distraught, she attempts to leave, but is prevented by the arrival of another guest, who turns out to be none other than Titus and the Praetorian Guards, who have arrived to sample the fish. At the end of the party, Helena chooses to stay on with Falco.

Returning to the house of the Hortensii, Falco discovers that Novus is dead in the privy after a banquet. He has been poisoned. Severina comes under suspicion, but Falco can find no real clue. Sabina wants to pay him off and considers him a failure, when the news arrives that Viridovix, the Hortensii's Gaulish cook, is also dead. He too was poisoned. Continuing to investigate, Falco is beaten up badly by thugs working for Appius Priscillus, a rival of the Hortensii, but is rescued and nursed back to health by Helena in their new apartment. When he finally recovers, he continues to investigate but returns only to see the apartment block in which they are living collapse. Believing Helena to be inside, Falco and others begin to dig. Helena arrives just as all hope seems lost. By a freak accident, Helena and Falco run into Cossus after helping to search for other survivors in the rubble, and after interrogating Cossus—now revealed to be an operative for the Hortensii—they discover that the Hortensii owned Falco's apartment block. Cossus is lynched and crucified by an angry mob.

All at once, Falco and Helena conclude that Severina poisoned Novus as revenge because a building owned by Novus had previously collapsed, killing her lover, and had (as Novus' representative) tried to demolish Falco's home to kill Helena out of romantic jealousy. Falco confronts Priscillus, the Hortensii women and Severina Zotica. Priscillus and the Hortensii women are revealed to have been planning to kill Novus (who was threatening to evict the other freedmen from the Hortensii business), but were beaten to him by Severina. Falco forces Priscillus to leave Rome, and blackmails the Hortensii into buying his silence by "donating" to a charity set up by Helena. As for Severina, Falco is unable to prove anything but Severina nevertheless doesn't go unpunished and is herself blackmailed into marriage by an inquisitive public servant who has managed to obtain evidence of her past misdeeds.

Left with no home, Falco and Helena move back into Fountain Court.

Characters in Venus in Copper

Friends, enemies and family
 Marcus Didius Falco – Informer and Imperial Agent from the Aventine.
 Helena Justina – Daughter of the Senator Decimus Camillus Verus, and romantic interest of Falco.
 Lucius Petronius Longus – Member of the Vigiles and friend of Falco.
 Anacrites – Imperial spy.
 Asiacus – Gladiator and bullyboy for Smaractus
 Decimus Camillus Verus – Senatorial father of Helena Justina.
 Famia – Horse doctor and brother-in-law of Falco, married to Maia.
 Gaius Baebius – Brother-in-law of Falco, married to Junia.
 Geminus – Auctioneer.
 Julia Justa – Mother of Helena Justina.
 Junia – Sister of Falco
 Lenia – A Laundress.
 Maia – Sister of Falco
 Rodan – Gladiator and bullyboy for Smaractus
 Smaractus – Falco's Landlord.
 Titus Caesar – Eldest son of the Emperor.
 Vespasian Augustus – Emperor of Rome.

Suspects and witnesses
 Anthea – Skivvy
 Appius Priscillus – Property mogul
 Cossus – A letting agent
 Hortensia Atila – Freedwoman and wife of Crepito
 Hortensius Crepito – Freedman and business partner of Novus
 Hortensius Felix – Freedman and business partner of Novus
 Hortensius Novus – A freedman, betrothed to Severina.
 Hyacinthus – Employed by the Hortensii
 Lusius – Praetor's clerk
 Minnius – Cake-seller
 Sabina Pollia – Freedwoman and wife of Felix
 Scaurus – Mason
 Severina Zotica – Suspect 'professional bride' with three deceased husbands.
 Thalia – Exotic dancer and snake charmer
 Tyche – Fortune-teller
 Viridovix – Gallic chef

Death toll
 Hortensius Novus – Found dead on the privy after being poisoned.
 Viridovix – Poisoned
 Cossus – Crucified by the crowd

Major themes

 The debut of Thalia, a very important recurring character in the Falco series.
 Developing relationship of Marcus Didius Falco and Helena Justina.
 An insight into the darker side of the real estate trade in ancient Rome.

Allusions/references to actual history, geography and current science
 Set in Rome in AD 71, during the reign of Emperor Vespasian.

Adaptations in other media
 BBC World: Radio 4 starring Anton Lesser as Falco and Anna Madeley as Helena, with Tracey Wiles as Severina

Release details
 1991, UK, Hutchinson, Hardback
 1992, UK, Arrow, Paperback
 1993, US, Crown/Ballantine, 
 1999, UK, Arrow, Paperback (as part of single-volume Omnibus, Falco on his Metal, with The Iron Hand of Mars and Poseidon's Gold.)
 2000, UK, Isis Audio,  (read by Christopher Scott)

References

External links
 The official website of Lindsey Davis

1991 British novels
Historical novels
Marcus Didius Falco novels
71
Hutchinson (publisher) books